The men's mass start in the 2015–16 ISU Speed Skating World Cup will be contested over five races on six occasions, out of a total of World Cup occasions for the season, with the first occasion taking place in Calgary, Alberta, Canada, on 13–15 November 2015, and the final occasion taking place in Heerenveen, Netherlands, on 11–13 March 2016.

The defending champion is Lee Seung-hoon of South Korea. This season Arjan Stroetinga won two of five races and the final classification.

Top three

Race medallists 

Note: in mass start, race points are accumulated during the race. The skater with most race points is the winner. The races are over 16 laps.

Standings

References 

 
Men mass start